The Knife River (Minnesota–Ontario) is a river of Minnesota and Ontario.

See also
List of rivers of Minnesota

References

Minnesota Watersheds
USGS Hydrologic Unit Map - State of Minnesota (1974)

Rivers of Minnesota